The Clare Intermediate Football Championship is an annual Gaelic football competition organised by the Clare County Board of the Gaelic Athletic Association for the second tier football teams in the county of Clare in Ireland.

The 2022 Intermediate Champions are Kildysart who defeated Cooraclare to win their third title at this grade.

Format
The series of games are played during the summer and autumn months with the county final usually being played at Cusack Park. The championship includes a group stage which is followed by a knock-out phase for the top teams. There is also promotion involving the Clare Senior Football Championship and relegation involving the Clare Junior Football Championship.

In 2016 a Football Review Agreement decided that from 2019 onwards the Clare Senior and Intermediate Football Championships would both involve twelve teams in an effort to make both more competitive. This meant that five clubs would lose their senior status and be relegated down to intermediate. The eleven remaining senior clubs would be joined by the intermediate champions to form the new senior championship, and thereby increasing the intermediate championship from eight to twelve teams. 2018 saw the relegation of Doora-Barefield, Kilfenora, O'Curry's, St. Breckan's and Wolfe Tones down to intermediate. As part of the 2016 Football Review Agreement, a pathway was left open for any amalgamations that wished to enter the senior championship. Two intermediate clubs (Naomh Eoin & O'Curry's) from West Clare took up this opportunity.

Qualification for subsequent competitions

Munster Club Football Championship
The winning club represents Clare in the Munster Intermediate Club Football Championship. 2013 champions St. Joseph's, Miltown Malbay progressed to the Munster final but lost to Clyda Rovers of Cork.

Roll of honour

 When Ennis Dalcassians won the 1943 Clare Junior Football Championship, they offered an opportunity to players from fellow junior club, Doora-Barefield, to join with them and enter the 1944 Clare Senior Football Championship as the Ennis Faughs. They went on to win four senior football titles in 1947, 1948, 1952 and 1954. When Ennis Dalcassians were relegated back down to junior level in 1945, a second Ennis Faughs team also entered and immediately won the 1946 Clare Intermediate Football Championship. The Ennis Faughs also won the 1945 Clare Intermediate Hurling Championship. The Ennis Faughs disbanded in 1956.

See also
 Clare Senior Football Championship
 Clare Football League Div. 1 (Cusack Cup)
 Clare Junior A Football Championship
 Clare Under-21 A Football Championship

References

Gaelic football competitions in County Clare